Ronald Dyson (June 5, 1950 – November 10, 1990) was an American soul and R&B singer and actor.

Early career
Born in Washington, D.C., Dyson grew up in Brooklyn, New York, where he sang in church choirs. At 18 years of age, he won a lead role in the Broadway production of Hair, debuting in New York in 1968. Dyson became an iconic voice of the 1960s with the lead vocal in the show's anthem of the hippie era, "Aquarius". It is Dyson's voice leading off the song and opening the show with the famous lyric "When the Moon is in the seventh house, and Jupiter aligns with Mars..." He made a cameo appearance in the 1979 motion picture version of Hair, singing "3-5-0-0" with another Hair alumnus, Melba Moore.

Later career

Dyson also appeared in the 1969 film Putney Swope.

After Hair, Dyson pursued his stage career with a role in Salvation in 1970. His recording of a song from the Salvation score, "(If You Let Me Make Love to You Then) Why Can't I Touch You?", successfully launched his record career, breaking into the Top 10 of the US Billboard Hot 100, peaking at number eight in 1970. The follow-up, "I Don't Wanna Cry", was a US R&B hit, climbing to number nine.

In 1971, his cover, "When You Get Right Down to It", was a more dramatic version of a song that had been a hit the previous year for the Delfonics; it reached number 34 on the UK Singles Chart in December.

His record company, Columbia Records, sent him to Philadelphia in 1973 to be produced by Thom Bell, one of the premier producers of the day, for several tracks. Bell's highly orchestrated style suited Dyson with hits including "One Man Band (Plays All Alone)", which reached number 28 on the Hot 100 and number 15 on the R&B chart, and "Just Don't Want to Be Lonely", peaking at number 60 on the Hot 100 and number 29 on R&B. They appeared on an album which was also made up of re-mixes of some earlier recordings, including "When You Get Right Down to It".

Dyson remained with Columbia working with top-line producers for another three albums, The More You Do It (1976), Love in All Flavors (1977) and If the Shoe Fits (1979). The title track of the first of the three resulted in one of the singer's biggest-selling records, reaching number six on the R&B chart. It was produced by Charles "Chuck" Jackson (half brother of Jesse Jackson and no relation to the more famous singer of the same name, who recorded for the same company in the 1960s) and Marvin Yancy, who had been responsible for successfully launching the career of Natalie Cole with a series of hits. (Jackson and Yancy had also produced hits for a Chicago soul group, The Independents, with whom Jackson was also lead singer.)

In 1986, Dyson also provided the vocals for the song "Nola" on the She's Gotta Have It soundtrack.

Dyson then moved to an Atlantic Records subsidiary label, the Cotillion Records label, in 1981 for two albums and several singles which were only moderately successful. His acting and singing career had begun to stall in the late 1970s due to ill health, and it was in 1983 that Dyson appeared on the R&B chart for the last time on Cotillion with "All Over Your Face". His final solo recording was "See The Clown" in 1990.

Death
Dyson died at the age of 40 from heart failure on November 10, 1990, in Brooklyn, New York.

Legacy
A posthumous release on Society Hill Records appeared in 1991, when a duet with Vicki Austin, "Are We So Far Apart (We Can't Talk Anymore)", dented the US R&B chart, reaching number 79 during a five-week run.

Discography

Studio albums

Singles

See also
List of disco artists (L-R)
List of Soul Train episodes

References

External links
 Allbutforgottenoldies.net

1950 births
1990 deaths
20th-century African-American male singers
American male musical theatre actors
Male actors from Washington, D.C.
20th-century American male actors
20th-century American singers
20th-century American male singers